Vincent Jack (6 August 1933 – 2006), was a Scottish professional footballer from Rosemarkie, Scotland who played as a defender for Accrington Stanley in the Football League.

References

1933 births
2006 deaths
Scottish footballers
Sportspeople from Highland (council area)
Accrington Stanley F.C. (1891) players
Bury F.C. players
Swindon Town F.C. players
Ebbsfleet United F.C. players
English Football League players
Association football defenders